The Blackpitts Mosque (Irish: Mosc na gCuithí Dubha) is a mosque in Dublin, Ireland. It has a Sunni orientation. It has a mostly Pakistani membership and is part of the Deobandi movement.

History

The building was originally a distribution centre for the International Clothing Holding’s retail operations, owned by the Bari family. It began to be used for Islamic prayer by Pakistani and Bosnian immigrants in 1992. In 2003 the company’s operations moved to Ballymount, leaving the building as a full-time mosque. At present, it is planned to remodel the building with Victorian and Mughal architecture, inspired by the George's Street Arcade and Iveagh Market.

It derives its name from the street on which it lies, which takes its name from the tanning vats that once stood there.

The mosque has a mostly Pakistani membership and services are held in Urdu, Arabic and English.

Controversies
In 2010, a leaked American diplomat cable described Blackpitts as a "suspected gathering place for some radical elements within the Pakistani community." Sheikh Ismail Kotwal, the imam, attracted controversy in 2010 after describing Osama bin Laden as a "a great leader" and "like prophet Mohammed"; he later partially retracted these statements.

In 2021, over 140 people were observed at a religious gathering at the mosque, in defiance of COVID-19 pandemic public health measures that forbade religious gatherings, except for funerals, and limited them to 10 people.

See also
 Islam in the Republic of Ireland

References 

1992 establishments in Ireland
Islamic organisations based in Ireland
Religious buildings and structures in Dublin (city)
Mosques in the Republic of Ireland
Deobandi mosques